Sergio Gutiérrez may refer to:
 Sergio Gutiérrez (footballer), Colombian football goalkeeper
 Sergio Gutiérrez Ferrol, Spanish tennis player 
 Sergio Gutiérrez Prieto (born 1982), Spanish politician
 Sergio Ernesto Gutiérrez Villanueva (born 1958), Mexican politician
 Sergio Gutiérrez Luna (born 1976), Mexican politician
 Sergio Gutiérrez Negrón, Puerto Rican author
 Fray Tormenta (Sergio Gutiérrez Benítez), Mexican Catholic priest and masked wrestler